Sir John Alexander Manzoni  (born 1960) is a British senior civil servant and business executive, who served as chief executive of the civil service and the Cabinet Office Permanent Secretary from 2014 to 2020.

Early life and education
Manzoni studied civil engineering as an undergraduate and a Master's degree in petroleum engineering at Imperial College London. He later studied for a Master's degree in management as a Sloan Fellow at Stanford University in 1994. He also has a Master of Business Administration degree.

Business career
Manzoni started to work for the oil and gas company BP in 1983. In 2000, he was a group vice president at the company. He was chief executive for refining and marketing at BP at the time of the Texas City Refinery explosion in 2005, in which 15 people were killed and 170 injured. An internal BP investigation cleared him of "serious neglect or intentional misconduct" but said he should have taken more steps to consider and mitigate the risks long before the disaster occurred, and criticised several aspects of his conduct. The company was fined $21m (£13m) for breaching safety rules.

In 2007, a month after the BP report was made public, Manzoni left BP to become the president and chief executive officer of Talisman Energy, an oil and gas exploration and production company. He replaced James Buckee, who had headed the company for 14 years. In his last year working at BP, Manzoni earned a salary of £758,000. During his time at Talisman the company focused on shale gas, selling a non-controlling stake in its North Sea business to Sinopec in July 2012. Manzoni resigned from Talisman and was replaced by Hal Kvisle in September 2012. In July 2015, the United States Environmental Protection Agency reported that it had fined Talisman Energy $62,457 for more than fifty health and safety violations at sites in Pennsylvania.

Civil service career 
In February 2014, Manzoni joined the British civil service as the chief executive of the Major Projects Authority, a role under the remit of the Cabinet Office. His former BP boss John Browne, who had also left BP in 2007 sat on Manzoni's appointment panel but did not chair it.

Whilst in this role, Manzoni also served as a director for the brewing and beverage company SABMiller, chair of the energy company Leyshon Energy and an adviser to the venture capital company Adamant Ventures.

On 13 October 2014, Manzoni was appointed as the first chief executive of the civil service, after the position was split out from that of the Head of the Home Civil Service when Bob Kerslake retired. A number of business figures who had been approached for the role were reported to have turned it down, with one commenting that the job was "un-doable", and the Financial Times reported that the government had drawn up a "plan B" to appoint Manzoni. His appointment was criticised by the Green Party Member of Parliament (MP) Caroline Lucas.

As chief executive of the civil service, Manzoni resigned from his positions at Leyshon Energy and Adamant Ventures but continued to serve as a director for SABMiller, for which he was criticised by MPs including Sarah Wollaston, then a Conservative MP serving as chair of the health select committee, as a conflict of interest given SABMiller's opposition to minimum alcohol pricing. An open letter from medical professionals and charities argued that the director role was incompatible with his civil service role. The Cabinet Office said that it was satisfied that there was no conflict of interest, before later announcing that Manzoni would resign from his position as director in 2015.

In 2015, Manzoni told a conference of the FDA trade union that civil service roles didn't need as much pay as they were more interesting than the private sector. In the role, he advocated a "functional" model of government aimed at developing skills across different government departments.

Manzoni's position of chief executive was initially a five-year appointment, but was extended until April 2020 for continuity with changes in government following the 2019 United Kingdom general election. He was succeeded by Alex Chisholm, who took the title of chief operating officer of the Civil Service.

Later career 
Manzoni was appointed to join the board of the alcohol company Diageo in 2020, with his term starting in October.

Manzoni was appointed Chair-Designate for the newly renationalised Atomic Weapons Establishment in November 2020: he will take up the post on 1 July 2021.

Honours 
Manzoni was appointed Knight Commander of the Order of the Bath (KCB) in the 2020 New Year Honours for public service.

References

External links 
 John Manzoni's page on gov.uk
 John Manzoni's page on Bloomberg.com

Living people
British chief executives
Directors of BP
1960 births
Knights Commander of the Order of the Bath
Permanent Secretaries of the Cabinet Office
Alumni of Imperial College London
Stanford University alumni